Hello AG was a Swiss charter airline offering holiday flights to destinations around the Mediterranean Sea out of EuroAirport Basel-Mulhouse-Freiburg, Geneva Airport and Zürich Airport.

History 
The airline was established in 2003 in Basel by Moritz Suter, who founded Crossair which later became Swiss International Air Lines in 2002, and launched operations on 6 August 2004. Originally being intended as a regional scheduled carrier, it was relaunched on 1 May 2005 as a charter airline. In December 2011, the company had 140 employees. The airline's head office was located at the General Aviation site at the EuroAirport Basel-Mulhouse-Freiburg in Saint-Louis, Haut-Rhin, France, near Basel.

The airline went bankrupt and ceased all flight operations on 21 October 2012.

Destinations

Africa
Cape Verde
Boa Vista: Rabil Airport
Sal: Amílcar Cabral International Airport
Egypt
Hurghada: Hurghada International Airport
Luxor: Luxor International Airport
Marsa Alam: Marsa Alam International Airport
Sharm el-Sheikh: Sharm el-Sheikh International Airport
Morocco
Agadir: Al Massira Airport
Marrakech: Menara Airport

Europe
Cyprus
Larnaca: Larnaca International Airport
Greece
Corfu: Corfu International Airport
Heraklion: Heraklion International Airport
Kefalonia: Kefalonia Island International Airport
Kos: Kos Island International Airport
Rhodes: Rhodes International Airport
Zakynthos: Zakynthos International Airport
North Macedonia
Ohrid: Ohrid Airport
Skopje: Skopje Alexander the Great Airport
Portugal
Funchal: Madeira Airport
Spain
La Palma: La Palma Airport
Mallorca: Palma de Mallorca Airport
Tenerife: Tenerife South Airport
Switzerland
Basel: EuroAirport Basel Mulhouse Freiburg Main Base
Zurich: Zurich Airport Base
Turkey
Antalya: Antalya Airport

Fleet

Fleet at closure
The Hello fleet consisted of the following aircraft (as of April 2012):

Previously retired fleet
Hello previously also operated the following aircraft:

References

External links

Official website

Defunct airlines of Switzerland
Airlines established in 2003
Airlines disestablished in 2012
Swiss companies disestablished in 2012
Swiss companies established in 2003